James Hubert Bilbray (May 19, 1938 – September 19, 2021) was an American politician, lawyer, and postal executive who served as the U.S. representative for Nevada's 1st congressional district from 1987 to 1995. He was a member of the Democratic Party.

Early life and education
Born in Las Vegas in 1938, Bilbray graduated from Las Vegas High School and attended the University of Nevada, Las Vegas, from 1959 to 1960. He received a Bachelor of Arts in government and public administration from American University in Washington, D.C., in 1962 and a Juris Doctor from the Washington College of Law in 1964. He served in the Nevada Army National Guard from 1955 to 1956 and in the United States Army Reserve from 1957 to 1963.

Career
Bilbray practiced law and was deputy district attorney of Clark County from 1965 to 1967. He was then chief legal counsel in the Clark County juvenile court from 1967 to 1968 and was an alternate municipal judge in Las Vegas from 1978 to 1980. He became licensed to practice law before the Nevada Gaming Commission and the Nevada Gaming Control Board in 1970. A Democrat, he ran for the United States House of Representatives in 1972 against conservative incumbent Walter Baring, a fellow Democrat who was disliked by his party's establishment. Bilbray won the primary and was expected to win the general election, but Baring surprised him by endorsing the Republican nominee, David Towell, who upset Bilbray in a close race. Bilbray made a comeback in 1980 when he was elected to the Nevada State Senate, where he served from 1981 to 1987, and also became chairman of the Taxation Committee and a member of the Judiciary Committee. He successfully ran for the U.S. House of Representatives in 1986 for the seat being vacated by Harry Reid, who made a successful run for the U.S. Senate in the same election. He served as chairman of the Small Business Subcommittee on Taxation, Tourism and Procurement and was also a member of the Foreign Affairs, Armed Services and Intelligence committees.

Bilbray lost his re-election campaign in the 1994 Republican Revolution, losing to Republican opponent John Ensign by less than 1,400 votes. Bilbray appeared to be well on his way to reelection until news surfaced that reports surfaced that one of his aides stood to make a huge profit from lands legislation sponsored by Bilbray.

After leaving Congress, Bilbray joined the law firm of Kummer, Kaempfer, Bonner and Renshaw as Of Counsel in 1996 where he has specialized in dealing with local, state and federal issues. In 2001, he received an honorary doctorate of laws from the University of Nevada, Las Vegas for his work in state and federal government. He was appointed a commissioner on the 2005 Base Realignment and Closure Commission and in 2006 was appointed a member of the Board of Governors of the United States Postal Service by President George W. Bush for a term ending in 2015. He resided in Las Vegas until his death in 2021. James H. Bilbray Elementary School in Las Vegas is named in his honor.

Personal life
Bilbray and his wife Michaelene had three daughters: Bridget Bilbray Phillips who was the first principal of James H. Bilbray Elementary School, Erin Bilbray-Kohn who unsuccessfully ran for U.S. House in Nevada's 3rd district in 2014, and Shannon Bilbray-Axelrod, a member of the Nevada Assembly since 2017. They also had one son, Kevin.  He was a cousin to Brian Bilbray, a two-time Republican congressman from Southern California. Bilbray died on September 19, 2021, at the age of 83.

References

External links
Biography at the United States Postal Service

Biography at Kummer Kaempfer Attorneys at Law
Biography at the Defense Base Closure and Realignment Commission
Larry J. Sabato's Crystal Ball
James H. Bilbray Elementary School

Nevada Senate Biography

1938 births
2021 deaths
American University School of Public Affairs alumni
Nevada lawyers
Nevada National Guard personnel
Democratic Party Nevada state senators
Politicians from Las Vegas
University of Nevada, Las Vegas alumni
Democratic Party members of the United States House of Representatives from Nevada
Washington College of Law alumni
Military personnel from Nevada
20th-century American politicians